Sauli Vuoti (born 1979, in Oulu, Finland) is Finnish musician and chemist. He is the vocalist and guitarist of the band Kinetik Control, founded in the beginning of the ongoing millennium and also band called Auringon Lapset. He has written most of the music and lyrics for Kinetik Control. His lyrics mostly deal with the superficiality and selfishness of modern-day humans and human relationships. Prior to Kinetik Control he was more closely associated with extreme metal.

In 1998 Vuoti enrolled to the University of Oulu, with pharmaceutical chemistry as his main subject. He defended his Ph.D in pharmaceutical chemistry successfully in 2007. His thesis is entitled “Syntheses and Catalytic Properties of Palladium (II) Complexes of Various New Aryl and Aryl Alkyl Phosphane ligands”.

Vuoti founded the first Finnish metal magazine, Inferno-magazine in 2001 and acted as the editor-in-chief and publisher until the year 2005, when the ownership shifted to Rumbapress. Under Vuoti's control, Inferno became the 2nd most popular music magazine in Finland. Later on he has been an assistant in e.g. Soundi-magazine. He is also known for being a longtime practitioner of martial arts and a big friend of MMA.

References

1979 births
Living people
Finnish rock guitarists
People from Oulu
University of Oulu alumni
21st-century Finnish male singers
21st-century guitarists